The 1954 San Francisco 49ers season was the franchise's 5th season in the National Football League and their 9th overall. The team was coming off a 9–3 record in 1953, finishing one game behind the Detroit Lions for a spot in the championship game.

The 49ers got off to a strong start, beginning the season with a 4–0–1 record, as they were trying to finish on top of the conference for the first time in team history. The Niners lost their next 2 games against the Chicago Bears and Los Angeles Rams by close scores, but they still found themselves in the playoff race as no team was running away with the conference. The 4–2–1 Niners had a huge game against the 5–1–0 Detroit Lions, which was a must-win game for San Francisco. But the Lions had other ideas, demolishing the 49ers 48–7, leaving them with a 4–3–1 record. San Francisco finished the season with 3 wins in their final 4 games, ending up in 3rd place with a 7–4–1 record.

Offensively, Y. A. Tittle had another strong season, throwing for 2,205 yards and 9 touchdowns, while completing 57.6% of his passes. Billy Wilson led the club with 60 receptions and 830 yards and 5 touchdowns. San Francisco's ground attack was overwhelming. Joe Perry rushed for an NFL-high 1,049 yards, and John Johnson rushed for 681 yards (2nd highest total in the NFL) and a team-high 9 touchdowns. Hugh McElhenny led the team with 8.0 yards per carry until he separated his shoulder on October 31 against the Chicago Bears.

Joe Perry (FB), Bruno Banducci (G) and Leo Nomellini (DT) made the Associated Press All-Pro team. Hugh McElhenny (HB), Billy Wilson (E), and Bob St. Clair (T) made the second squad.

Schedule

Standings

References
1954 49ers on Pro Football Reference
SHRP Sports
Database Football

San Francisco 49ers seasons
San Francisco 49ers